The Golden Lions (currently known as the Fidelity ADT Golden Lions for sponsorship reasons) is a South African professional rugby union team based in Johannesburg who compete in the annual Currie Cup and Rugby Challenge. The team is governed by the Golden Lions Rugby Union (GLRU), and was originally known as Transvaal (after Transvaal Province), before changes to the political landscape in South Africa forced a name change to the Gauteng Lions, before again being changed to the Golden Lions. The GLRU also operates the associated United Rugby Championship franchise , which also draw players from Griquas.

History
The Transvaal Rugby Football Union, with its headquarters in Johannesburg, was formed in 1889 after delegates from different clubs in the region decided to form a united rugby union to look after the well-being of the clubs. Prominent clubs involved in the process were Pirates, Wanderers, Pretoria, Potchefstroom and Kaffrarians. The first elected president was Bill Taylor (born 1858). Transvaal's first match was against Griquas in Kimberley on 31 August 1889.

The original colours used by Transvaal were dark blue and white jerseys, blue shorts and blue-and-white socks. It is unsure when the union decided to switch over to a white jersey with a red hoop with black shorts and socks. There is also a school of thought that the union adopted the famous Kilmarnock strip of white top with red hoop as a Kilmarnock member, Alex Frew, captained them when they beat The British Isles touring team in 1903. These colours are still in use today. It is also from these colours that the teams’ nickname, "Rooibontes" came from.

The original union encompassed a much bigger catchment area than it does currently. Unions that gained independence from Transvaal are Western Transvaal (currently the Leopards) in 1920, Northern Transvaal (currently the Blue Bulls) in 1938, and Eastern Transvaal (currently the Pumas) in 1948. Robert Owen Loftus Versfeld, after which the stadium in Pretoria is named, was a lifetime member of the Transvaal Rugby Football Union. According to a Lions tale – 120 years of the red and white, Versfeld died of a heart attack at Ellis Park in 1932 when he attended a match between Transvaal and the Free State.

The union has undergone several name changes in recent years – first changing its name to the Lions in 1993, the Gauteng Lions in 1997, before finally changing to The Golden Lions Rugby Union (GLRU) in 1998. The GLRU competes in the Currie Cup and Vodacom Cup competitions under the sponsorship name of Xerox Golden Lions. The Golden Lions and Lions share the same home stadium, Ellis Park, located in the suburb of Doornfontein.

Financial turmoil
In the 1980s the union ran into serious financial trouble, mostly as a result of redeveloping Ellis Park. Transvaal supporters nearly did not have a union to support anymore as at one stage the most likely outcome was that the union would disband. In 1984 the union had R37 million of debts to repay, which forced Volkskas Bank to carry the union for a period. This debt mainly came from the union redeveloping the old Ellis Park into a modern 80,000- seat stadium in 1980. The union started out with R1 million of its own money, and intended to raise another R12 million through the sales of suites and life memberships. However, due to the underperforming team, the union had a hard time to sell these ideas to businessmen and the intended revenue to fund the stadium never materialized.

In March 1984 Volkskas took over the management of Ellis Park. By August the union was told to repay debts of more than R40 million by 4 September. According to Louis Luyt in his autobiography, Walking Proud, the union was left with interest amounting to R20,000 per day. It was at this time that the then president Jannie le Roux was ousted by the clubs on 3 September 1984, and in his place came self-made millionaire Dr. Louis Luyt, a former provincial lock forward for the Orange Free State. Through the business acumen of Dr Luyt, the union was able to become financially stable once again. Dr Luyt saw an opportunity to use Ellis Park as a way for the union to cover its debt, and according to him, he used this asset as a means of renegotiating the unions’ debt with Volkskas Bank and the Johannesburg City Council. 

In order to refinance the debt the union would relinquish control of Ellis Park, and control of the stadium would be taken by a new company called Ellis Park Stadium Incorporated (EPSI) on which Volkskas would have 6 board members, the City Council 3 members and the Louis Luyt group 3 members. Thus the rugby union had no representation on the board. The rugby union would however be contractually obliged to play all future matches at the venue, and would have first right over the use of Ellis Park. However, 20% of all gate receipts generated would be paid over to EPSI. However, Volkskas was not fond of this idea, and eventually took complete control over the stadium as a new company called Ellis Park Stadium Pty Ltd. According to Luyt the union would now be allowed to keep 25% of its gate revenue plus R100 000 of the advertising revenue. Luyt also managed to negotiate a clause stipulating that the rugby union had first right of refusal should Volkskas decide to sell the stadium in the future.

In 1987 the bank decided to sell the stadium to Mr. Johan Claassen (a former Springbok) for R26.5 million, but with the union having first right of refusal, Luyt started working along with First National Bank (FNB) to buy the stadium back for the union. At the time FNB wanted to rename the stadium First National Stadium, although the City Council was against this as they wanted the stadium to retain the name of their former city councilman who provided the area for the stadium. This is in stark contrast when the stadium name was sold to Coca-Cola in 2008. Eventually FNB provided the union with the finance needed to take control of the stadium. Luyt reduced the capacity of the stadium from 80 000 to 60 000 by adding 88 suites behind the two goal posts. His rationale for this was that the general public preferred to sit on the sides of the field, thus these seats were deemed economically unviable. However, companies were satisfied to have any suite in the stadium. Thus even when losing 20 000 seats, the union was able to generate a bigger income from this "dead space" of the stadium. Even before construction on the suites started, they were fully subscribed. The cost of building the suites were R4 million, and the revenue of selling these were R25 million. Even though seating was reduced the union was able to show a constant revenue stream because of the suites. 

Eventually Luyt listed the stadium on the stock exchange, although this venture was unsuccessful. In spite of the unsuccessful stock exchange listing the union was able to repay all of its debt by 1993. Ellis Park was known as Coca-Cola Park between 2008 and 2012, although as one of the FIFA World Cup 2010 venues, for the period of the world cup, it was known as Ellis Park again. The stadium, and surrounding swimming arena and indoor sports arena, is run by Ellis Park World of Sport Pty Ltd, in which the GLRU has a stake.

The golden years
Even though the Lions are regarded as one of the most successful teams in South African rugby history, the union was for a long time regarded as the perennial underachievers. After winning the Currie Cup in 1972 for the sixth time, supporters had to wait a further 21 years for the trophy to return to Johannesburg. Even though the pain of not securing the Currie Cup was somewhat soothed by winning the Lion Cup (a now extinct knock out competition) in 1986, 1987 and 1992, it was Currie Cup glory supporters were really craving.

The team did come close on a few occasions, but always seemed to fail at the final hurdle losing the final in 1974, 1986, 1987, 1991 and 1992. Finally however, under the guidance of Kitch Christie as head coach and Francois Pienaar as captain, the side was able to win the Currie Cup in 1993 with a 21-15 victory over Natal in Durban. Memorably, Uli Schmidt (hooker) scored the winning try after chasing down a kick. The union repeated their success in 1994 by beating the Orange Free State by 56-35 in Bloemfontein. This was however not the end of the union's success.

They also managed to win the 1993 Super 10 with a 20-17 win over Auckland from New Zealand in Johannesburg – thus making the union the first South African team to win a trans-national title. In 1995 Transvaal reached the final of the Super 10 again but lost to the Australian Queensland. The union also managed to scalp the 1993 and 1994 M-Net night series, a pre-season warm up competition. It was also during the 1993 season that the team managed to go on an unbeaten run of 19 games (18 wins, 1 draw). The Lions won the Currie Cup again in 1999 when they beat the Sharks 32-9 in Durban, and were on the losing side in the 2002 and 2007 finals. They ended their 12-year trophy drought in 2011, beating the  42-16 in the final in Johannesburg.

Turmoil and rebuilding: 2000–12
As a result of South African sides being uncompetitive in the expanded Super 12 competition, South African Rugby decided to manage their 14 provincial unions as franchises, combining the unions for the Super 12 competition, before splitting up again to compete as 14 separate sides in the Currie Cup. The old way of using the Currie Cup as a qualifying competition for the Super 12 was thus scrapped. The GLRU was combined with the Free State Cheetahs and Griquas to form the Cats Super 12 franchise. Although home games were mostly played at Ellis Park, some games were also played in Bloemfontein at the Free State Stadium (formerly Springbok Park). This caused the franchise considerable administrative problems in forming a united identity between the three provincial teams and their supporters. Players were also reportedly unhappy about the travel arrangements with the members of the Cheetahs and Griquas often being away from their families for extended periods of time. As the Cats the franchise never really achieved the great heights it was expected to, considering that two of South Africa's biggest teams were part of the franchise. The Cats did however have a good spell in 2000 and 2001 when under the guidance of former New Zealand coach Laurie Mains the union managed to recruit several young stars like Joe Gillingham, Cobus Gomes, Rory Kockot and reach the semi-finals of the Super 12, where they lost to the Brumbies and the Sharks respectively. Incidentally, as core of the franchise, the Lions won the 1999 Currie Cup, also under the guidance of Mains.

After the Super 12 was expanded in 2006 to become the Super 14, South African Rugby was awarded an additional franchise. Even though there was pressure from government to award the franchise to the Eastern Cape-based Southern Spears (now the Southern Kings), the franchise was awarded to the Free State Cheetahs and Griquas thus ending their involvement with the Cats. The Cats were now made up of the Lions, the Leopards and the Pumas. The Johannesburg Super 14 franchise was still known as the Cats in 2006, but finally rebranded themselves as the Super 14 Lions in 2007.

Midway through 2008, Prof. Jannie Fereirra was replaced by former Lions and Springbok lock Kevin de Klerk as president of the GLRU. Throughout the 2000s attendances at Ellis Park has been on the downslide, with the team's performances following a similar course. With the rise of the Sharks, Blue Bulls and to a lesser extent Western Province, and the tendency of South Africans to play in Europe, the GLRU had difficulty in keeping their star players contracted. Some of the players who left the GLRU during the 2000s were: Andre Vos, Rassie Erasmus, Joe Gillingham, Andre Pretorius, Willie Wepener, Ethienne Reyneke, Thinus Delport, Schalk Brits, Wikus van Heerden, Gcobani Bobo, Conrad Jantjies, Gerhard Mostert, Anton van Zyl, Jaco Pretorius, Gerhard Vosloo, Joe van Niekerk, Wayne Julies, Ernst Joubert, Ricky Januarie, with players such as Rory Kockot being lost through the unions youth system. The union also lost the services of long serving Springbok Jaque Fourie in 2009 even though the player was still under contract. Fourie came through the Lions youth system, representing the union at school, u/19 and u/21 level. Fourie took his contract to arbitration after which was found that his contract was not legally binding on a technical point. This opened the door for Willem Alberts and Louis Ludik to join the Sharks for the 2010 season, even though they were also under contract with the GLRU.

In 2009 the GLRU invited former Springbok coach Jake White’s company Winning Ways to conduct an audit of the Union's systems and structures, after which it was recommended that immediate changes needed to be made. After three seasons of underachievement with the Super Rugby franchise, Eugene Eloff was dismissed as coach, and Hans Coetzee was appointed as interim coach. The players threatened to strike in response, and lost their next match to the touring British and Irish Lions, who ran in ten tries to win 74–10. White's audit was particularly severe on the physical conditioning of the players and the poor defence displayed by the union.

The Xerox Lions finished sixth on the 2009 Currie Cup, losing 6 games by less than 7 points with physical conditioning and defence being a particular focus for their campaign. In November 2009 Dick Muir, former Sharks head coach and current Springboks backline coach, was appointed Director of Rugby – a task encompassing looking after the unions rugby structures as well as taking control of the Auto and General Super 14 Lions as head coach. Coetzee and former Springbok lock, Johan Ackerman were appointed as his assistants. 

Although the Lions have lost quite a few players throughout 2009, new players signed for 2010 include Tonderai Chavangha (Springbok wing), Carlos Spencer (All Black Flyhalf), Wikus van Heerden (Springbok flanker), Deon van Rensburg (centre), Marius Delport (utility back), JP Joubert (scrumhalf), Jonathan Mokuena and Burton Francis (Flyhalf).
In 2011 under new coach John Mitchell, a new style was implemented into the team that would lead the Lions to their first Currie Cup title in 12 years.
In December 2012 the Union announced that Manie Booysen had been appointed as new CEO, starting his role in January 2013. He replaced Ruben Moggee, who had served as interim CEO for fourteen months.
Before the 2013 Currie Cup the Lions lost a lot players due to the Lions franchise being relegated from the Super Rugby competition in 2013.

The Revolution

The team had to rebuild again with new players and new head coach Johan Ackermann. New CEO Rudolf Straeuli and President Kevin De Klerk. With their new style of rugby that was mostly used by New Zealand teams being implemented by Johan Ackermann, they reached the Currie Cup final twice in a row, losing to Western Province in 2014 at Newlands and winning in 2015 against Western Province at Ellis Park after going undefeated the season. After being promoted back to Super Rugby in 2014, the Lions have reached the finals in both 2016 and 2017. They have also produced a number of new Springboks including captain Warren Whiteley. In the 2017 Currie Cup season Swyn De Bruin was appointed the New head coach

Finals results

Currie Cup

Super 10

Vodacom Cup

Notes

1 Orange Free State have since been renamed to the Free State Cheetahs.
2 Northern Transvaal was renamed to the Blue Bulls.
3 The Falcons were originally known as Eastern Transvaal.
4 Griqualand West was renamed to Griquas.

Current squad

The following players have been included so far in the Golden Lions squad for the 2023 Currie Cup Premier Division:

References

External links
 Official club website - LionsRugby.co.za
 Supporter Page - LionsWorld.co.za
 Supporter Forum - LionsWorld.co.za/Forum
 Supporter Page - Transvaal.co.za
 Supporter Page - WeTalkRugby.com

 
1889 establishments in the South African Republic
South African rugby union teams
Sport in Johannesburg